Tharakan is a Hindu caste from the Palakkad district of Kerala, South India. The majority of the Tharakans are located in Valluvanad, with major agglomerations around vellinezhi,Vayillyamkunnu, Katambazhippuram,Kuttanassery, Sreekrishnapuram, Mangode, Thiruvazhiyodu, Chethallur and Mannarkkad. Many Sanskrit scholars and popular astrologers originated from this community.

Etymology
The word Tharakan literally means the holder of document of Raja (Tharakan : Common letter or document of Raja, Gundert's dictionary). They are so called because they were the recipients of 'Tharaku' or writ of social privilege issued to them by the ruling head of the Zamorins of Calicut.

Tharakan is an honorific title possessed by ancient traders. The word is rooted from Tamil word Tharaku/Tharavu-which means brokering or commission. The word is also linked with placing an order, tax or tariff and commodity trade. Sometimes the word is also related to lending money. In Tamil to denote a broker, people use Tharakar or Tharagar. So it can be assumed that a tharakan is the one who intermediates between manufacturer and buyer.

Gothram
Tharakans belong to Vaishya group and are Saivites. Tharakan trace their origin from Chola mandalam and claims that they belong to Kannaki’s community (heroine of Tamil epic Chilappathikaram). Mannadiyar, Guptan, Moothan, and Pathukudi are the related ethnic groups. A section of Tharakan community in Angadippuram became Nairs as per the advice of king. 

Agriculture and business were their traditional ways of earning a living in times past. They follow Makkathaayam traditions and the after death pollution time (Pula ) for family members is 10 days.

Male members are identified by their family (Tharavad) name and female members move in with their husband's family after marriage and keep the husband's family name. The title "Guptan" is common after middle age. Married female members were earlier addressed as "AkathaaL" (in short as "Thaal" − means the person lives inside the house) and with time, the suffix transformed to "Ammal" and later to Amma and Gupta.

Origin

Legend
There are some details available about the origin of this community – in 'KOTTICHEZHUNNALLATH'  (The first programme used to be conducted by Samoothiri (Zamorin) kings after swearing on ceremony of each Eralppad- second in command − to establish their control over the region. The last KOTTICHEZHUNNALLATH was believed to be held in 1909 ). It points to the era way back to 13th−14th century which says about the asylum of a minister and his men from a local kingdom in the bank of river Kaveri of then Cholamandalam – to the king of Calicut (Kozhikkode) – The dispute arose from the decision of local king to marry the clever daughter of the minister who had found out a solution for a challenging problem which was haunting the king for days together. The legend – The challenge was to make a necklace within 41 days, using a bowl of peculiar pearls which was gifted by some foreign traders to the king. Being curved holes inside, many famous brilliant pandits had tried and failed to make a pearl necklace. However the intelligent teenage daughter of the minister could succeed in finding a solution for the challenge and making the necklace with the help of some ants by using a ghee applied thread making it a pearl necklace. Impressed up on the extraordinary intelligence of the girl who made the pearl necklace the ruling king wanted to marry her. But as the king was inferior in caste, the minister and his related families disagreed. The angry king gave ultimatum for accepting the marriage or all vaishyas to leave the kingdom. Due to this the entire vaishya population in the desom consisting of many sections, around 7200 families, had to travel away from chola-desam and were segregated in groups. Some of the groups traveled towards west to Cheranaadu (presently Keralam).

As they had a bitter experience of living in a kingdom where they could not get the justice from their king, they decided to settle in a Desam(place) where the ruling king has vision and justice. To find that, they used to present a pot filled with gold but covered with a layer of sugar on top. They had the habit of sitting before the king (which was meant disrespectful, and after giving the pot, they requested the king to give them land for living. Normally the kings to whom they approached rejected their request by thinking it was foolish to give them land in lieu of sugar. Finally they reached Walluvanad area and approached Samoothiri (Zamorin) of Kozhikkode (Calicut)for land. They had the same test with Zamorin. But King Zamorin got annoyed of their sitting and asked his minister " Mangattachan" to check the pot. After finding the golden powder in the pot Zamorin appraised of their cleverness but to check their integrity, asked them to come again next day. To test them, Zamorin made the sitting place muddy but they again sat there after spreading a cloth, though it was muddy. After this, the king understood it was not that they did not want to respect the king but it was their habit. Impressed by their intelligence and straight forwardness, Samoothiri gave permission to build 'nagarams' (at places they liked) and sent pathinaayirathil nair – The chieftain who can arrange that much warriors on demand by zamorin – along with them and asked them to meet the king after construction of their Kuladevatha temples.

They built four 'nagarams' called Puthanangadi, Thiruvazhiyode, Vayillyamkunnu and Mangode (current names Chethallur, Thiruvazhiyode / sreekrishnapuram, Katampazhippuram and Mangode respectively) for cultivation and trade. After construction of temples, they met samoothiri along with their acharya. Impressed by the acharya's sivapooja and devotion, Samoothiri gave more land and arranged adiyantharakkar for them (the temple constructed for those adiyanthirakkar - "kammalasserykkaavu" is still there near Thiruvazhiyode)  but as per the local tradition, samoothiri restricted the wearing of poonool (the sacred thread) to upanayanam & marriage time only and later the tradition has been discontinued.

Historical background
It is believed that the groups consisting of Tharakan along with members of Guptans community reached valluvanad were of Eralpuram, Adithyapuram, Paschimapuram & Ramapuram nagarams under the leadership of the minister SANKARA NAYANAR ( belonging to Eralpuram nagaram) and they took their kuladevatha (Goddess) Bhagavathy and acharya Gyanasivacharya along with them.. Thiruvazhiyode nagaram was considered the "Melnagaram" among the four nagarams and the tradition of giving "Nagarappanam" to Thiruvazhiyode group during marriage (if any one of bride-groom is from Thiruvazhiyode) was followed in earlier days. This ritual was to mark respect for the "Aadi Nayanar".

The name Tharakan was assigned to this group belonging to valluvanad region, by Zamorin(being vaishya and part of "Thraivarnnikam" ) through Punnasseri Nambi Neelakanta Sharma (earlier addressed as Moothan (Moothavan meaning elder)  and sometimes as Ezhssan(Ezhuthachan), Menon (Melavan – a position in village), Andaar (Andavan), etc.). The title was initially started at Punnassery Namby Gurukulam (Saraswathodyodini), Pattambi where prominent Sanskrit scholar and astrologer CK Krishna Guptan was the beloved disciple of Sri Nambi. Later Guptans became part of the history of valluvanadan area. DESAYANAM published by samabhavini books – which narrates the history of Vayillyamkunnu desam of pre-independence era – gives more details about Guptans and their history.

Religion and hereditary
Durga  (Parasakthi)of "Ardhanareeswara" concept of Lord Siva was predominant and reflected in their traditions and customs. "Saktheya" upasana was very common in Tharakan families in olden days. It was a tradition to conduct Saktheya pooja (Bhuvaneswari pooja) once in a year in each family earlier, for overall prosperity and still some families are following this tradition. Suryanarayanan Ezhuthachan  and his nephew Devaguru – Thunchan's beloved disciples – were performing Saktheya pooja and their successors of Chozhiyath family of Mangalamkunnu (near Ottappalam ) perform Saktheya poojas even now.  The usage of Thunchath, Chozhiyath, Chokkath by locals were popular in this area until the second half of the 20th century.

In the family goddess (paradevatha) concept, each Tharakan family is attached to one of the three Bhagavathi Temples, viz. Panamkurussi( Chethallur ), Vayillyamkunnu (Kadampazhippuram) and Thiruruvaraykkal (Thiruvazhiyode) situated in the erstwhile Valluvanad area of the Palakkad District. Vayillyamkunnu Bhagavathy temple is considered as one of the three Thirumandhamkunnu Temples   along with Angadippuram & Kongad,.[9] A story related to Samoothiri( Zamorin ) about the power of Panamkurussy Bhagavathy on his way to Karimpuzha [disambiguation needed] is still popular in Chethallur area. The other Nagara temple of "Mangode" is attached to related community "Tharakan".  Moothans of Palakkad town and the Mannadiyars of Nenmara and Kollengode are other similar community groups related to them.

Demography 
Tharakan population is spread within Palakkad district only. The major pockets being Katampazhippuram, Mangalamkunnu, Thiruvazhiyode, Punchapadam, Sreekrishnapuram, Mannampetta, Pulappetta, Peringode, Kongad, Mannarkkad, Thachanattukara, Attasseri, Olavakkode, Edathanattukara, Chethallur, Chunangad, Mangode, Pookottukav, vellinezhi, Kuttanssery etc.

Lifestyle and occupation
According to Gundert, they were originally warehouse-keepers at Palghat. Tharakans are Kshetram Ooralans of many famous temples like Thiruvaraikkal temple and Vayilyamkunnu temple. Tharakan houses are called Tharavads. Each tharavad has a unique name. Mostly tharavad names ends with ‘Ath’ or ‘Athu’- which means home in Tamil. The Marriages between the members from same Tharavad is prohibited in this caste.Tharakans follow Makkathayam (patrilineage) tradition.

Tharakans were traders in ancient days. However they turned to agriculture sector after they migrated into Malabar land. Families without even a small paddy field was very rare in those times. The cross section of the community was a blend, ranging from poor farmers to big feudal land lords. Most of their houses were called "Kalam" (കളം) which means the place for after – harvesting activities of paddy. After the land reforms, the attraction of agriculture was in the downward trend and some have shifted to plantation field and later focused on education, business and service sectors. Teaching was the most popular profession in earlier days among the community and many prominent Teachers with their proud disciples had positively contributed towards the improvement of their community as well as the society in general. Today's generations are more focused on professional education and many have excelled in the fields of Engineering, Medical Science, Robotics, Space Technology, Computer Software, Defence etc. But there is almost a vacuum in the area of political and civil administration.

Food habits are a mix of vegetarian and non-vegetarian. Though many women still prefer to be vegetarian but majority of men eat non- vegetarian food (mainly fish & chicken). Other than the normal Hindu festivals like Onam, Vishu& Thiruvathira, another special festival related to Onam, 'POTTA THIRUVONAM' (on the day of Thiruvonam star coming in the Malayalam month of 'thulam') used to be celebrated in olden days mainly for showing the sister's affection to their brothers – similar to the concept of Rakhi of North India. One major occasion of family get together of these groups are during the annual temple 'pooram'(പൂരം) festival of their respective paradevatha temples.

Marriage customs and traditions 
Tharakan's marriage related processes start from "Ashtamangalyam" (അഷ്ടമംഗല്യം) function – the engagement at bride's residence. After horoscope matching, on the day of "Ashtamangalyam", a "Thamboola Prasnam" – astrological prediction based on Beettle leaves and Deepam (oil lamp)  – will be conducted as a ritual and results of the "Prasna" will be interpreted to all relatives assembled there. (This is to take remedial measures and precautions for hurdles foreseen in the future married life, if any.). Other customs connected to this function are tying of horoscopes of bride & groom together symbolically for the fixation of marriage and "Pon veykkal" ( presenting Gold ornament to bride) by Groom's relatives (normally sister of groom) followed by feast. Dowry system is not in this community and rather a tradition of giving ONAPPUDAVA (ഓണപ്പുടവ) – giving clothes – by groom to the relatives (of both bride & groom) is still followed during marriage as part of taking blessings from elders.

Marriage is normally called "PAANIGRAHANAM" ( പാണീഗ്രഹണം ) and it is a simple function nowadays. Today's marriages are for one day and some major customs still followed are "Nadhaswaram" – treated as sacred music will be accompanied, THALAPPOLI – receiving function at bride's residence(marriage hall)by girls with a tray of flowers and oil lamp, KAALU KAZHUKAL – Bride's younger brother will clean the groom's feet while receiving him to the mandapam, THALIKETTU (solemn Vow) – Tying the thali chain in the bride's neck and exchange of rings there after, PAANIGRAHANAM (accepting the bride by taking holy vows)  – Bride's uncle ( or father) will perform the "kanya daanam" by keeping the hand of bride into the hand of groom and AGNI PRADHAKSHINAM – after holding the hands mutually by a knot of their small fingers, groom and bride together move around the "Vivaha-homa agni"-the sacred fire. Palum Pazhavum' (feeding sweet milk and banana after marriage) and 'Kavukeral'( visiting their respective paradevatha temples after 7 days of marriage) are other customs related to marriage.

Kaikottikkali, an important art form by women folk used to be performed in bride's house (the night before the marriage) and groom's residence (on the final day of marriage after receiving bride and groom) in olden days. Elite class used to conduct Kathakali too. '

Birth-related rituals 
On birth of a child in the family, the main rituals are 'Irupathettu' – the first birth day (star) as per lunar calendar (28th day after birth) and 'Choroon' (ചോറൂണ്) – first feeding of food (annaprasam) in 6th month along with child's naming ceremony. Shashtipoorthy (ഷഷ്ഠിപൂര്‍ത്തി) – 60th birthday & Sathabhishekam(ശതാഭിഷേകം) – seeing of 1000 full moon/84th birth day, are celebrated widely .

Death rituals
Tharakan observe 10 days of defilement (pula- after death pollution time). After cremation (burial in olden days), the eldest son will follow deeksha for these days (or for a mandalam – 41 days or a year). On 9th day is 'Athazha oottu' and on 10th day, 'Sanchayanam' – collection of bones of the demised person – followed by 'Baliitharppanam' by 'seshakriyakkar'. 'Nimanjanam' of the collected bones will be done at Thirunelli, Thirunavaya or in a nearby river on 10th day or after a year.

Cultural and Social Heritage
Vayillyamkunnu was one of the major cultural centers in south Malabar during pre-independence era due to the excellence of many Sanskrit scholars in the area. It is believed that great Thunchan and Sree Punnassery Nambi had blessed this place because of the presence their beloved disciples. The community has produced a number of scholars.

Tharakan mingled well with other communities in the region. Some initiative took place in the direction of caste cohesion during the 1980s when 'Arya Vaisya Samajam' was launched and it works for the welfare of the members by promoting academic excellence, etc. 'Aryayogam Matrimonial Services' is another initiative in the social front today.

Important personalities
 Mr.G.Ramachandran, opposition Deputy Leader, Palakkad District Panchayath from 1995 to 2000 and Founder General Secretary, Tharagar Pathukduy Mannadiar Service Society (TPMS).

See also
Mannadiyar
Guptan

References

Resources
 William Logan, Malabar Manual
 Edgar Thurston, Castes and Tribes of South India
 Kottichezhunnallath (1909)
 Aaryavaisyanmaar (1987)
 EP Bhaskara Guptan, Desayanam,  Samabhavini Books (2004)
 Prof. KP Narayana Pisharody, Punnassery Neelakanta Sharma
 Puliyath Krishnan. Kutty Guptan
 Dr. Francis Bukkanan, A Journey from Madras through countries of Mysore, Canara & Malabar (1807) –
 Prof. KV Krishna Iyer, Zamorins of Calicut – 
 Kesari Magazine – Nila edition (1971)
 Adiyath Ramaguptan, Vayillyamkunnu Devaswom Sthalapuranam.

Social groups of Kerala